Pöyhönen is a surname. Notable people with the surname include:

Janne Pöyhönen, Finnish reggae artist
Marko Pöyhönen (born 1987), Finnish ice hockey player
Markus Pöyhönen (born 1978), Finnish track and field athlete
Nora Pöyhönen (1849–1938), Finnish horticulturist
Taavi Pöyhönen (1882–1961), Finnish politician
Tapio Pöyhönen (1927–2011), Finnish basketball player
Valtteri Laurell Pöyhönen (born 1978), Finnish jazz guitarist